Year of the Cat is the seventh studio album by Al Stewart, released in 1976. It was produced and engineered by Alan Parsons. Its sales helped by the hit single "Year of the Cat", co-written by Peter Wood and described by AllMusic as "one of those 'mysterious woman' songs", the album was a top five hit in the United States. The other single from the album was "On the Border". Stewart wrote "Lord Grenville" about the Elizabethan sailor and explorer Sir Richard Grenville (1542–1591).

Stewart had all of the music and orchestration written and completely recorded before he even had a title for any of the songs. In a Canadian radio interview he stated that he has done this for six of his albums, and he often writes four different sets of lyrics for each song. The title track derives from a song Stewart wrote in 1966 called "Foot of the Stage" with prescient lyrics about Tony Hancock, one of Britain's favourite comedians who died by suicide two years later. When Stewart discovered that Hancock was not well known in the United States, he went back to his original title "Year of the Cat".

Cover art
The cover design, by Hipgnosis and illustrator Colin Elgie,  depicts a woman who has an apparent obsession with cats. She can be seen in the mirror dressing up as a cat for a costume party, and all of the items on her dresser have feline motifs.  Stewart used the same concept for the cover of his 2004 Greatest Hits album, but with most of the cat items replaced with references to his other singles.

Reception

In the United States, Year of the Cat was certified platinum in March 1977, indicating sales of more than one million copies.

Contemporary reviews were mixed but generally positive. Billboard praised the album featuring "Stewart's cool vocals and exceptionally well-arranged songs that are progressive without being pretentious", whereas Robert Christgau thought Stewart's move from historical themes to the tone of "spy-novels" was an improvement. Peter Reilly, writing for Stereo Review, found Stewart's "hissing sibilant 's's" unintentionally hilarious, especially when combined with the "gloweringly melodramatic" "On the Border". Reilly nonetheless praised the songwriting, "warm, easy atmosphere", and Stewart's guitar skills.

Alan Parsons' production and rich arrangements were widely praised. By 1987, Year of the Cat had become a popular record used for hi-fi demonstration.

Chris Woodstra called Year of the Cat Al Stewart's masterpiece. Stephen Thomas Erlewine of AllMusic agreed, calling it the perfection of Stewart's sound and style.

Track listing
All tracks composed by Al Stewart, except where indicated.

1976 Original LP edition
Side 1
"Lord Grenville" – 5:00
"On the Border" – 3:22
"Midas Shadow" – 3:08
"Sand in Your Shoes" – 3:02
"If It Doesn't Come Naturally, Leave It" – 4:28

Side 2
"Flying Sorcery" – 4:20
"Broadway Hotel" – 3:55
"One Stage Before" – 4:39
"Year of the Cat" (Stewart, Peter Wood) – 6:40

2001 Remaster bonus tracks
"On the Border" [live] - 3:48
"Belsize Blues" - 3:30
"Story of the Songs" - 9:42

2021 45th Anniversary Deluxe Edition
"Lord Grenville" - 5:04
"On the Border" - 3:23
"Midas Shadow" - 3:13
"Sand in Your Shoes" - 3:05
"If It Doesn't Come Naturally, Leave It" - 4:30
"Flying Sorcery" - 4:22
"Broadway Hotel" - 3:59
"One Stage Before" - 4:42
"Year of the Cat" - 6:43
"Belsize Blues" - 3:28
"Apple Cider Re-Constitution" [Live in Seattle 1976] - 5:23
"The Dark and the Rolling Sea" [Live in Seattle 1976] - 4:58
"One Stage Before" [Live in Seattle 1976] - 5:00
"Soho (Needless to Say)" [Live in Seattle 1976] - 3:56
"Not the One" [Live in Seattle 1976] - 5:22
"On the Border" [Live in Seattle 1976] - 4:05
"Broadway Hotel" [Live in Seattle 1976] - 4:59
"Roads to Moscow " [Live in Seattle 1976] - 8:14
"Nostradamus " [Live in Seattle 1976] - 9:13
"Sirens of Titan" [Live in Seattle 1976] - 3:13
"The Post World War Two Blues" [Live in Seattle 1976] - 5:07
"Year of the Cat" [Live in Seattle 1976] - 8:36
"Sand in Your Shoes" [Live in Seattle 1976] - 3:02
"Carol" [Live in Seattle 1976] - 5:09
"If It Doesn’t Come Naturally, Leave It" [Live in Seattle 1976] - 5:21
"Lord Grenville" [5.1 Surround] - 5:04
"On the Border" [5.1 Surround] - 3:23
"Midas Shadow" [5.1 Surround] - 3:13
"Sand in Your Shoes" [5.1 Surround] - 3:05
"If It Doesn’t Come Naturally, Leave It" [5.1 Surround] - 4:30
"Flying Sorcery" [5.1 Surround] - 4:22
"Broadway Hotel" [5.1 Surround] - 3:59
"One Stage Before" [5.1 Surround] - 4:42
"Year of the Cat" [5.1 Surround] - 6:43

Personnel
Al Stewart - vocals, guitar, keyboards
Peter White - spanish guitar ("On the Border")
Tim Renwick - guitar
Peter Wood - keyboards
Don Lobster - keyboards
George Ford - bass
Stuart Elliott - drums, percussion
Andrew Powell - string arrangements
Bobby Bruce - violin
Marion Driscoll - triangle
Phil Kenzie - alto saxophone
David Pack - backing vocals
John Perry - backing vocals
Tony Rivers - backing vocals
Stuart Calver - backing vocals
Graham Smith  - harmonica
Technical
Hipgnosis, Colin Elgie - cover design
Rob Brimson - back cover photography

Charts

Weekly charts

Year-end charts

Sales and certifications

References

Al Stewart albums
1976 albums
Albums with cover art by Hipgnosis
Albums produced by Alan Parsons
Janus Records albums
RCA Records albums
EMI Records albums
Arista Records albums
Rhino Records albums
Parlophone albums